Peder is a village and municipality in Košice-okolie District in the Kosice Region of eastern Slovakia.

History
In historical records the village was first mentioned in 1275.

Geography
The village lies at an altitude of 182 metres and covers an area of 11.279 km². The municipality has a population of about 405 people.

External links

Villages and municipalities in Košice-okolie District